The Estelle Mouzin case is a French criminal case which began on 9 January 2003 with the disappearance of Estelle Mouzin in the city of Guermantes in France. Estelle Mouzin was a nine-year-old girl who was returning from school when she disappeared.

For a long time, this disappearance was not solved and the investigation remained at a standstill. But sixteen and a half years later, on 27 November 2019, Michel Fourniret, a pedophile serial killer already sentenced to life imprisonment, became the main suspect: he was indicted for "kidnapping and false imprisonment followed by death". Then, on January 24, 2020, Monique Olivier, his former wife, claimed that he had indeed killed Estelle Mouzin; finally, on March 6, 2020, this claim was confirmed with Michel Fourniret's confession.

Each year, a march is organised in memory of Estelle Mouzin.

Disappearance
On Thursday 9 January 2003, Estelle Mouzin, a nine-year-old girl, disappeared on the way back from school in Guermantes. She was seen for the last time in front of a bakery, while she was returning to the house of her mother, Suzanne Mouzin, who was in the process of divorce from the girl's father, Eric Mouzin. Her mother reported the fact she was missing to the local police station shortly after 7:00p.m. Her disappearance sparked huge media coverage all over the country.

Investigations

First suspect
The first person to be suspected was serial killer Michel Fourniret, who was arrested in June 2003 in Belgium. However, after consideration, the police discounted Fourniret because he seemed to have an namely, a phone call was made from his home at the time of Estelle Mouzin's disappearance.

Two weeks before Mouzin's disappearance, a girl of the same age was almost kidnapped by a man in a white van, from which she was able to make a facial composite. When Fourniret was suspected, investigators showed his photo to the girl, who said it wasn't him who tried to kidnap her. While taking the police to a place he buried one of his victims, Fourniret described the clothes his victim was wearing, and it was very close to those Mouzin wore the day she disappeared.

Despite Fourniret's "alibi" and denial of any involvement, Fourniret became a suspect again when the police found at his home a video recording and photos of the girl on his computer. However, in 2007 the police abandoned pursuit of the case against Fourniret, citing his "alibi" and the lack of sufficient supporting evidence.

The scope of the inquiry, led by the Commissioner Jean-Marc Bloch, was unprecedented; more than 130 persons were interrogated by the police and all the houses of the city were searched.

2008 investigations

Further arrests took place on Thursday 31 January 2008 in the cities of Brie-Comte-Robert and Lognes (Seine-et-Marne). The Royal Wok restaurant in Brie-Comte-Robert was searched, after suspicion that human remains might be found. On February 1, this theory proved groundless as only animal remains were uncovered at the restaurant.

2009 onward investigations
In 2010, the French authorities launched a new call for witnesses by disseminating a computer-aged portrait of Estelle Mouzin. Ten years later, in March 2020, Michel Fourniret confessed to having killed Mouzin.

2020 investigations
Excavations were planned in 2020 at two sites in the Ardennes.

On 23 January 2020, Michel Fourniret, in front of judge Sabine Khéris, asserted that his memory "got the better of him" but that he had to be "considered guilty" of Estelle Mouzin's disappearance. "I urge you to treat me as guilty," Michel Fourniret said. In order to verify whether his confession held true, Monique Olivier, Fourniret's ex-wife, had to be re-interrogated. According to Olivier, Fourniret was the man responsible for the kidnapping and murder of Estelle Mouzin.

On 24 January 2020, Olivier confirmed to the investigating judge Sabine Khéris that it was indeed her (and not Fourniret) who had phoned the home of Michel Fourniret's son on 9 January 2003, the day of the girl's disappearance, and that the girl presented the profile her husband was looking for. She added that Michel Fourniret had made reconnaissance sightings in the days preceding the abduction, and that one evening he returned from his hunt stating that he had spotted "a beautiful little target".

On 21 August 2020, the lawyer of Olivier declares that his client is now indicted for "complicity" and affirms that her ex-husband Michel Fourniret had kidnapped Estelle Mouzin on the 9 January 2003 and took her to Ville-sur-Lumes in the Ardennes, “to sequester her” and “that he had raped and strangled her” . Partial DNA traces of Estelle Mouzin are found on a mattress in the former house of Fourniret's sister.

See also
 List of solved missing person cases

Notes and references

Bibliography
 Christian English & Frédéric Thibaud, Affaires non classées, tome II (chapitre : la disparition d'Estelle Mouzin), First édition, 15 juin 2004, 294 pages, 
 Éric Mouzin (Estelle Mouzin's father) & Véronique de Bure, Retrouver Estelle (éditions Stock, 5 janvier 2011), 180 pages

Documentaries

France
 « Avis de recherche », 2003, Envoyé spécial, France 2.
 « La disparition d'Estelle Mouzin », 2003, Secrets d'actualité, M6.
 « Estelle : entre enquête et oubli », 2006, Complément d'enquête, France 2.
 « Disparition d'Estelle : mystère à Guermantes », 4 March 2009, Enquêtes criminelles : le magazine des faits divers, W9.
 « Estelle Mouzin : les mystères d'une disparition », 31 March 2010, 90' faits divers, TMC.
 « Disparition d'Estelle : le combat d'une famille », June 2011, TMC.
 « Affaire Estelle Mouzin », 6 January 2012, Non élucidé, France 2.
 « Estelle Mouzin - l'enquête », 9 February 2013, Les Faits Karl Zero, 13e Rue.
 « Affaire Estelle Mouzin : 10 ans de mystère », 26 October 2013, Chroniques criminelles, NT1.

Belgium
 « Estelle Mouzin : les nouvelles pistes », 29 May 2013, Devoir d'enquête, la Une & RTBF.

References

External links
Association Estelle

2000s missing person cases
2003 crimes in France
2003 in France
Female murder victims
January 2003 events in France
Missing French children
Missing person cases in France
Seine-et-Marne